Perfect as Cats: A Tribute to the Cure is a charity record released by Los Angeles indie label Manimal Vinyl on October 28, 2008.  It features covers of The Cure favourites by The Dandy Warhols, Bat For Lashes, Kaki King, Devastations, ex-Godflesh frontman, Justin K. Broadrick's Jesu, Rio en Medio, Lewis & Clarke, Sarabeth Tucek, Mariee Sioux, Xu Xu Fang, Blackblack, Gangi, Rainbow Arabia and over 20 more artists and bands. The record was mastered by Xu Xu Fang's Bobby Tamkin.  The proceeds of the album went to the Invisible Children charity which works with the war torn youth in Sudan.

Pitchfork rated the album a 3.9.

Track listing
Disc One

Disc Two

Additionally, several more tracks were available as iTunes exclusives:

References

Tribute albums
2008 albums
Invisible Children
The Cure